The first season of the TV gameshow competition series The Button premiered in April 2018 on BBC One. The objective of the show is that the family with the most money at the end of the episode from winning the challenges is declared the winning team.

List of episodes and challenge results

Episode 1 (20 April) 

The Garstons were the winners of the first episode, but decided not to leave the show and keep their cash prize to carry over to the next episode.

Episode 2 (27 April)

The Halls were the winners of the second episode and decided to keep their cash prize, but because they did, they had to leave the show. A new family, the Utleys, were introduced one week after.

Episode 3 (4 May)

The other teams could not compete in Challenge 5 as The Ward / Mills and The Marchants were competing in to the head-to-head against each other.
The Ward/Mills were the winners of the third episode, but decided not to leave the show and keep their cash prize to carry over to the next episode.

Episode 4 (11 May)

The McCulloughs were the winners of the fourth episode and decided to keep their cash prize, but because they did, they had to leave the show.

References 

2018 British television seasons